The 1894 Kentucky Derby was the 20th running of the Kentucky Derby. The race took place on May 15, 1894.

Full results

 Winning Breeder: H. Eugene Leigh & Robert L. Rose; (KY)

Payout
 The winner received a purse of $4,020.
 Second place received $300.
 Third place received $150.
 Fourth place received $100.

References

1894
Kentucky Derby
Derby
May 1894 sports events
1894 in American sports